The Keys of the Kingdom is a 1944 American film based on the 1941 novel The Keys of the Kingdom by A. J. Cronin. The film was adapted by Nunnally Johnson, directed by John M. Stahl, and produced by Joseph L. Mankiewicz. It stars Gregory Peck, Thomas Mitchell, and Vincent Price, and tells the story of the trials and tribulations of a Roman Catholic priest who goes to China to evangelise.

Plot
Father Francis Chisholm is visited in his old age by Monsignor Sleeth at his fictional Scottish parish of Tynecastle in Tweedside. The Monsignor informs Francis that the Bishop thinks it would be better if he retires, as his somewhat unorthodox recent teachings have become a distraction. The Monsignor retires to his room in the rectory,  and finds Father Francis' journal that recounts his story from 1878. As the Monsignor begins to read the journal, a flashback begins.

One night during his childhood, Francis' father was beaten by an anti-Catholic mob during a rainstorm. As his mother attempts to lead her husband to safety, they both die in a bridge collapse, leaving young Francis to be raised by his aunt until he leaves for the seminary with his childhood friend, Anselm "Angus" Mealey. Francis studies for about a year, but finds himself still in love with Nora, a girl from his home town. He learns that, after he left for the seminary, Nora had a child out of wedlock with another man, he goes to see her but arrives just as she dies, giving birth to a daughter, Judy. He goes back to the seminary and completes his studies.

Bishop McNabb suggests that Francis volunteer for the missions in China. Francis accepts, even though it will take him far from home and Nora's young child, Judy. Francis arrives in Pai-tan, China to find that the mission has been destroyed by floods. He rents a small room in the city and starts to evangelise, but because he has no money or influence he is chastised by some "rice Christians" who only attended to receive free rice. They throw mud at the sign he erects advertising his little Christian room.

A young Christian Chinese, Joseph, offers to help rebuild the church. He had heard of the return of a missionary and has walked 5 days to reach the village. He does not seek money for help in rebuilding the mission. He sees it as a privilege to "work for God" and Francis is humbled by the man's Christian spirit. They create the St Andrews Christian Mission.

Francis receives a shipment of medical supplies from his childhood friend, Dr William (Willie) Tulloch. An old woman comes with her granddaughter and asks that Francis care for the child when she, the old woman, dies. Francis is then summoned to the home of local official, Mr Chia, to cure Chia's only son of an infection. Despite the risk if he fails, Francis saves the boy. A few weeks later, Chia comes to Francis in order to convert to Christianity, but Francis rejects him because he would be converting from gratitude rather than true belief. A relieved Chia then donates land and provides labourers to rebuild the mission. Three nuns arrive and set up further Christian provisions. The Reverend Mother, a cold, aloof woman born in wealthy nobility, immediately causes friction between herself and Francis.

Two years later, Willie visits from Scotland and is able to create a makeshift hospital. The mission is destroyed along with much of the town in a series of fires caused by imperial troops battling republican forces. Willie is fatally shot and dies in Francis' care.  The imperial general demands most of the mission's food and funds or the troops will destroy the mission. A republican army officer and Francis come up with a plan. They approach the imperial camp pretending they are carrying food and money. The bundle is explosives. The republican officer places it next to the main offending cannon. Francis throws a torch and ignites it. The cannon is destroyed as are 32 troops. Francis is injured and has a limp from thereon.

Later, Angus arrives as part of a review of missionary sites. He tells Francis that Bishop McNabb is dead. He explains that the Church cannot pay for rebuilding the mission, and that Francis has the lowest of all in conversion rates. He tells Francis to focus on converting rich Chinese and to improve his clothes and accommodation to impress the locals, but Francis refuses. Afterwards Reverend Mother Maria Veronica, apologises for her longstanding disdainful attitude to Francis, and realises he has a truly humble Christian spirit.

Further ten years pass. Francis is keeping bees and making wax and honey. A new church has been built. A rival American mission has been opened in Pai-tan - a Protestant mission run by the Methodist Church under Rev Fiske and his wife. Francis goes to visit.

More years pass. Francis reaches retirement age and two young priests come to replace him. Francis plans to look after Judy's son, Andrew, when he goes back to Scotland. On his final day the townspeople line the street as Francis drives through in an open top car. Joseph had a speech prepared but cannot read it. Francis blesses the crowd.

The flashback ends, and Monsignor Sleeth admits to Francis that he spent the whole night reading Francis' journal and that he won't be telling the Bishop anything is amiss at Francis' parish, leaving him free to continue serving his parish, and raising Judy's orphaned son, Andrew. They get their fishing rods and head off.

Cast

Production
Alfred Hitchcock liked the novel and hoped to direct it,  but opted to direct Lifeboat. Actors considered for the role of Father Chisholm included Spencer Tracy, Orson Welles, Edward G. Robinson, Gene Kelly, and Henry Fonda. Ingrid Bergman was considered for the part of Mother Maria-Veronica, though Rose Stradner, the wife of producer Joseph L. Mankiewicz, was cast instead.

Reception
Variety called The Keys of the Kingdom a "cavalcade of a priest's life, played excellently by Gregory Peck."

In a 2010 review, film critic Jay Carr wrote:Again and again, one is impressed by the depth of talent on studio rosters of the time, in this case 20th Century-Fox. Not just Gwenn, Mitchell, Hardwicke, and Price, but James Gleason, Roddy McDowall (Chisholm as a boy), Peggy Ann Garner, Anne Revere and Benson Fong dot the cast list in this solidly crafted film – measured, stately, patient, never loud or pounding (except when the mission is caught in a war between imperial and nascent republican troops, and Father Chisholm briefly takes up arms!). It would have to be because it's essentially a film about interiority translated into service, a film of cumulative increments...The bottom line is that The Keys of the Kingdom and Peck convince us they're about a man in a cassock spending his life trying to do the right thing.

Awards and honors
The film was nominated for Academy Awards in the following categories:
 Best Actor in a Leading Role (Gregory Peck)
 Best Art Direction-Interior Decoration, Black-and-White (James Basevi, William S. Darling, Thomas Little, and Frank E. Hughes)
 Best Cinematography, Black-and-White (Arthur C. Miller)
 Best Music, Scoring of a Dramatic or Comedy Picture (Alfred Newman)

Also, the film is recognized by American Film Institute in these lists:
 2006: AFI's 100 Years...100 Cheers – Nominated

Music
Alfred Newman incorporated Irish and Chinese elements into the score. The theme at the heart of the track, "The Hill of the Brilliant Green Jade", is associated with a Chinese nobleman (Mr. Chia) who befriends Father Chisholm after the latter has saved his son's life. Newman later reused the melody in his Oscar-winning score for the 1955 film Love Is a Many-Splendored Thing. Richard Rodgers lifted the tune for the song "I Have Dreamed" in the 1951 musical The King and I.

Adaptations to other media
The Keys of the Kingdom was adapted as a radio play on the November 19, 1945, episode of Lux Radio Theater, featuring Ronald Colman and Ann Harding. It was also adapted on the August 21, 1946, episode of Academy Award Theater, with Gregory Peck reprising his leading role.

See also
List of American films of 1944

References

External links
 
 
 
 
 The Keys of the Kingdom film synopsis at Crazy for Cinema
 The Keys of the Kingdom film review at Variety

1944 films
1944 drama films
1940s American films
1940s English-language films
1940s Mandarin-language films
20th Century Fox films
American drama films
American black-and-white films
Cantonese-language films
Christian missions in China
Films about Christianity
Films about Catholicism
Films about Catholic priests
Films about Catholic nuns
Films based on British novels
Films based on works by A. J. Cronin
Films directed by John M. Stahl
Films produced by Joseph L. Mankiewicz
Films set in China
Films set in Scotland
Films set in the 1870s
Films set in the 1880s
Films set in the 1890s
Films set in the 1900s
Films set in the 1910s
Films set in the 1920s
Films scored by Alfred Newman
Films with screenplays by Nunnally Johnson
Films with screenplays by Joseph L. Mankiewicz